Bambu may refer to:

People
 Bambu (rapper)
 André Bambu (born 1979), Brazilian professional basketball player
 Robson Bambu (born 1997), Brazilian footballer

Arts, entertainment, and media
 Bambu (album), the incomplete second album by Dennis Wilson
 Big Bambú, a 2014 work of art by artists Doug and Mike Starn

Other uses
 Bambū
 Bambu (rolling papers), a brand of rolling papers for hand rolled cigarettes
 Bambu, Iran, a village in South Khorasan Province, Iran

See also
 Bamboo (disambiguation)
 Bambú (disambiguation)